Sherdrick Deon "Sed" Bonner (born October 19, 1968) is a former American football quarterback who played fifteen seasons in the Arena Football League (AFL).

High school years
Bonner attended Azusa High School in Azusa, California and was a student and a letterman in football, basketball, baseball and track & field.

College career
Bonner graduated from Cal State Northridge in 1991 with a Bachelor of Science degree in kinesiology and was a member of Sigma Pi fraternity. While there, he started at quarterback and led the Matadors to the 1990 Western Football Conference co-championship and the program's only playoff appearance. He completed 319 of 637 passes for 3,533 yards and 18 touchdowns in 37 career games. He earned honorable mention All-Western Football Conference honors his senior year in 1991. Bonner also lettered in basketball, volleyball, and track and field. He played 23 games for the basketball team in the 1987-88 season, outside hitter for the men's volleyball team in the 1991 season, and took first place in the high jump three times. He was inducted into CSUN's Matador Hall of Fame on October 2, 1998.

Professional career

National Football League
In 1998, he was on the practice squad for the 1998 NFC Champion Atlanta Falcons. During the 1997 season, he was with the Arizona Cardinals and the San Diego Chargers.

Arena Football League
On March 25, 2002, Bonner re-signed with the Rattlers.

On Friday, April 7, 2006, he got his 100th career win as his Arizona Rattlers won over the newly formed Utah Blaze 64-52 on the road.

On Saturday, April 28, 2007, in a 67-45 road loss to the New York Dragons, Bonner joined Clint Dolezel and Andy Kelly as the only quarterbacks to throw 800 career touchdown passes.

On Saturday, October 27, 2007, the Rattlers released Bonner after 14 seasons. He signed a two-year contract with the Chicago Rush on October 30, 2007. However, he was released in September 2008, after just one season with the Rush.

Throughout his AFL career, Bonner completed 3,350 passes for 42,246 yards, and 855 touchdowns. He is also the winningest quarterback in league history, with 134 regular season victories and 21 playoff wins (as of April 2, 2007). He is widely considered one of the greatest players in AFL history.

Coaching career
Bonner began the 2011 AFL season as the offensive coordinator of the Chicago Rush after playing for Chicago in 2008. He called the plays and worked with quarterback Russ Michna.

Broadcasting career
Bonner began his broadcasting career when he was approached by KAZT-TV in Phoenix to be an analyst for Thursday night high school football games.  After the Rush folded, he turned his attention to broadcasting serving as both color analyst and sideline reporter for AFL games on CBS Sports Network in 2013 and later ESPN starting in 2014. Bonner also calls college football games for the Mountain West Conference on AT&T SportsNet Rocky Mountain, where he received a regional Emmy Award in 2015.

Hall of Fame
Bonner is a 2012 inductee into the Arena Football League's Hall of Fame.

He was inducted into the Cal State Northridge Matadors Hall of Fame in 1998.

Personal
Bonner is currently married with two children.  He also runs a business where he coaches aspiring quarterbacks.

Career statistics

Stats from ArenaFan:

Notes

External links

 
 Chicago Rush bio

1968 births
Living people
College basketball announcers in the United States
American football quarterbacks
Arena football announcers
Arizona Cardinals players
Arizona Rattlers players
Atlanta Falcons players
Cal State Northridge Matadors football players
Chicago Rush players
College football announcers
People from Azusa, California
Players of American football from California
San Diego Chargers players
Sportspeople from Los Angeles County, California